Mira Rapp-Hooper is an American political scientist and expert on security in the Asia-Pacific who serves as a senior advisor on China at the State Department's Policy Planning Staff. Her field of expertise includes Asia security issues, deterrence, nuclear strategy and policy, and alliance politics. She was previously a senior fellow for Asia studies at the Council on Foreign Relations and a senior fellow at Yale Law School’s Paul Tsai China Center.

She holds a B.A. in history from Stanford University and an M.A., M.Phil., and Ph.D. in political science from Columbia University. At Columbia she was research assistant to Kenneth Waltz, the founder of structural realism. Previously she worked at the Center for a New American Security (CNAS) as a senior fellow in the Asia-Pacific Security Program, and at the Center for Strategic and International Studies (CSIS) as a fellow and as director of CSIS’ Asia Maritime Transparency Initiative.

Dr. Rapp-Hooper was also Asia Policy Coordinator for the 2016 Hillary Clinton campaign. She was a Foreign Policy Interrupted Fellow, and is a David Rockefeller Fellow of the Trilateral Commission and an Associate Editor with the International Security Studies Forum. Her 2021 appointment to the Department of State was seen as part of the Biden administration's pivot to the Indo-Pacific.

She has published in Political Science Quarterly, Security Studies, and Survival (academic); the National Interest, Foreign Affairs, and The Washington Quarterly (press).  She is a regular journalistic source on Asia issues and has provided expert analysis to the New York Times, The Washington Post, and NPR and the BBC. Her forthcoming book Shields of the Republic: The Triumph and Peril of America’s Alliances (Harvard University Press, 2020) analyzes the history of and the current challenges to the United States' system of alliances. Her second book, An Open World: How America Can Win the Contest for Twenty-First-Century Order, co-authored with Rebecca Lissner, is forthcoming with Yale University Press.

Recent publications
‘Saving America’s Alliances,’ Foreign Affairs, March/April 2020 issue
‘Nuclear Stability on the Korean Peninsula,’ Survival, Volume 62, 2020, Issue 1 (with Dr. Adam Mount)
‘Presidential Alliance Powers,’ The Washington Quarterly, Volume 42, 2019, Issue 2 (with Matthew C. Waxman)
'The Open World,' Foreign Affairs, May/June 2019 issue (with Dr. Rebecca Friedman Lissner)
'Mapping China's Health Silk Road,' Council on Foreign Relations Asia Unbound blog, April 10, 2020 (with Kirk Lancaster and Michael Rubin)

References

External links
 Twitter page
 CFR Profile

Living people
American women political scientists
American political scientists
International relations scholars
Stanford University alumni
Columbia University alumni
1984 births
21st-century American women